Hajany may refer to places in the Czech Republic:

Hajany (Brno-Country District), a municipality and village in the South Moravian Region
Hajany (Strakonice District), a municipality and village in the South Bohemian Region